Koncert v Praze (In Prague – Live) (1983) is an album by American country singer Johnny Cash.

Recorded in 1978, the album was released in 1983 and featured a bilingual (Czech-English) biography of Johnny Cash. The album was originally released by Supraphon in Czechoslovakia only; according to music historian Rich Kienzle, the album's first release beyond Europe occurred with its inclusion in the 2012 Columbia Records CD box set Johnny Cash: The Complete Columbia Album Collection.

A re-release on red translucent vinyl, with the original artwork, was pressed for Record Store Day in 2015.

The album is notable for devoting nearly all of Side B to railroad-related songs, including a 10-minute medley. It was also, in terms of order of first release, the final album to feature Cash's original bass player Marshall Grant, who left the group several years prior to its release, but is featured owing to this being a live recording from 1978.

The concert featured on the album is a different performance from the one released on VHS/DVD from the same tour.

Track listing 
"Ring of Fire"
"Folsom Prison Blues"
"I Still Miss Someone"
"Big River"
"I Ride an Old Paint" & "Streets of Laredo"
"Sunday Morning Coming Down"
"I Walk the Line"
"Last Date"  
"City of New Orleans"
"Hey Porter" & "Wreck Of the Old '97" & "Casey Jones" & "Orange Blossom Special"
"Wabash Cannonball"

Personnel 
Johnny Cash (1–7, 9–11)
The Carter Family, Jan Howard – chorus
The Tennessee Three
Marshall Grant – bass guitar
W. S. "Fluke" Holland – drums
Bob Wootton – guitar
Jerry Hensley – guitar
Earl Poole Ball – piano solo (8)

References 

1983 live albums
Johnny Cash live albums
Columbia Records live albums